Xylocopa virginica, sometimes referred to as the eastern carpenter bee, extends through the eastern United States and into Canada. They are sympatric with Xylocopa micans in much of southeastern United States. They nest in various types of wood and eat pollen and nectar. In X. virginica, dominant females do not focus solely on egg-laying, as in other bee species considered to have "queens". Instead, dominant X. virginica females are responsible for a full gamut of activities including reproduction, foraging, and nest construction, whereas subordinate bees may engage in little activity outside of guarding the nest.

Description and identification
The bee is similar in size to bumblebees, but has a glossy, mostly black body with a slight metallic purple tint. X. virginica males and females have generally the same mass, but can be differentiated visually by the male's longer body and the female's wider head. The males also have a white spot on their face. Additionally, the males have larger thoracic volumes for given masses.  Females of different social standing can also be told apart based on morphology. Primary females are larger than secondary or tertiary females, and also have more mandibular and wing wear.

X. virginica have distinctive maxillae that are adapted to performing perforations on corolla tubes to reach nectaries.  Their maxillae are sharp and wedge-shaped, allowing them to split the side of corolla tubes externally to access the nectar.  Eastern carpenter bees also have galae on their maxillae that are shaped like large, flat blades.  Bees with sharp galae can use these to further aid in penetrating the corolla tubes.

Taxonomy and phylogeny 
X. virginica belongs to the genus Xylocopa, which consists of over 400 species worldwide, in the subgenus Xylocopoides, which contains only 5 New World species, including Xylocopa californica, which also occurs in the U.S.

Distribution 
X. virginica is found throughout much of North America east of the Rocky Mountains and at least as far north as Nebraska, southern Ontario, and Maine.

Nesting
X. virginica build their nests in wood, bamboo culms, agave stalks, and other comparable materials, but they prefer to nest in milled pine or cedar lumber. The nests are built by scraping wood shavings off of the wall. These shavings are then used to create partitions between nesting cells.  The entrance cuts into the wood perpendicular to the grain, but they are built parallel beyond the entrance. These nests may be either social, containing groups of two to five females, or solitary. Social nests are more common, despite the fact that brood productivity is actually lower when females choose to nest together. Because X. virginica builds its nests in wood structures, it is common for it to nest in constructed furniture or buildings.  X. virginica is the most common large carpenter bee in eastern North America, and it nests in small groups, so nests are fairly commonly encountered.

The nests are usually round and typically have one to four tunnels.  They have multiple branches, with each adult female living and laying eggs in a separate branch but females sharing one common entrance. Because the nests are costly to build, it is common for females to reuse old nests.

Life cycle 
In X. virginica, mating occurs only once a year, in the spring. Eggs are laid in July, starting farthest from the exit hole, and by about August and mid-September, larval development has completed and all the pupae have become adults. Researchers suggest that there is a mechanism that synchronizes the emergence time of young that are laid at different times by causing the younger eggs to develop faster. This mechanism prevents bees that would emerge sooner from removing their siblings and decreasing their potential competition.

Bees that have newly emerged have a soft cuticle and white wings. The wings later transition to brown, then to a bluish black. They can fly 3–4 days after emergence, but they remain in their nest for at least two weeks, consuming nectar but not pollen. The juveniles begin the next mating cycle the following spring, so one generation develops in a year.

Females begin to exhibit signs of senescence around July. The indicative behavior includes resting in flowers, remaining in the nest, or even just falling to the ground from flight. Older individuals also crawl, avoid taking flight, and do not struggle when handled by humans. The old bees die by early August, the same time that juveniles emerge from brood cells. Due to the simultaneous nature of expiration of old bees and emergence of new ones, there is little overlap between generations, except for some females that survive a second winter.

Behavior 

X. virginica is not a solitary bee species, but it is not truly social either. The weak form of sociality they exhibit, with one female doing the majority of the work and caring for her sisters, may be a transitional step in the evolution of sociality.

Dominance hierarchy 
Female X. virginica can have solitary nests, but they usually nest in social groups. The social order of X. virginica is broken into three groups: primary, secondary, and tertiary. Primary females act as the dominant within a nest and are in charge of reproduction, providing food for the larvae, and laying all the eggs.  This is different from many bee species in which there is a queen that focuses her energy solely on laying eggs while relying on provisions provide by subordinate bees.  Secondary females may sometimes participate in oviposition, and they reinforce this potential role by helping provide for the larvae or performing nest maintenance.  Tertiary females rely on the provisions provided by primary females and quietly await overwintering while remaining inactive.

Studies have shown that primary females are usually the bees that have overwintered twice, while tertiary bees have only overwintered once.  Tertiary bees will most likely survive a second overwintering  and develop further to become primary female the following year.  Secondary bees may survive a second winter, but that is unlikely if they actively forage after their first overwintering.

Division of labor among the sexes 
Not all females do the same work in a social nest. This is evident based on the varying levels of wear on the wings and mandibles of females of various social standing. Although many nests have more than one female, there is a division of labor between the older and younger females.  During nesting time, only the older females are responsible for nesting duties such as digging, excavating the cells, lining the cells, collecting food, and ovipositing.  Evidence of this activity can be found in their worn mandibles.  Young females rarely leave the nest and guard the entrance while the older females work, resulting in unworn wings and mandibles in the younger females.  Additionally, X. virginica is the only known species in which one-year-old females cohabit the nest with two-year-old females that do all the labor.

Males often spend long periods of time hovering, flying, or in fast pursuit of intruders, while female flight activity is usually very directed, such as flights to flowers and food sites.  Larger females have an advantage because they can carry larger amounts of pollen or nectar back to the nest and can fly longer distances.

Diet 
X. virginica survive mostly on nectar and pollen.  Newly emerged bees do not have food stored in their nest, but they are occasionally brought nectar.  X. virginica use their maxillae to penetrate the corolla of plants and reach the nectar stores, a behavior known as nectar robbing. This happens when the bee pierces the corollas of long-tubed flowers, thus accessing nectar without making contact with the anthers and bypassing pollination. In some plants this reduces fruit production and seed number. In other plants, defensive mechanisms allow pollination to occur despite perforation of the corolla.

Mating behavior 

Each nest usually has one mated individual.  Mating occurs in April and is often accompanied by a bobbing dance that involves about a dozen males and only a few females.

Males require female activity, specifically flight, in mating.  Occasionally before mating, the couple will face each other and hover for a few minutes.  When the male contacts the female, he mounts her back and attempts to push his abdomen under hers.  Copulation then occurs, and it is almost always followed by more mating attempts.  If, during copulation, the female lands, the couple will disengage and the male will hover waiting for the female to take flight again; however, although the males almost always disengage and pause copulation when the female lands, there have been instances recorded in which the males will hold on to the female with all six legs and flap his wings in an attempt to lift her back into the air.

Larger males are usually more successful in mating.  Because of their competitive advantage due to their size, males will likely claim a territory near female nest sites.  Smaller males will stay at foraging sites or other areas they think females may pass so they can mate with reduced competition.

Kin selection 
Research has shown that, regardless of sex, X. virginica show more aggression toward non-nestmates than nestmates, indicating that they can recognize each other. By living in social groups with inclusive fitness, the bees can raise offspring with the help of the nest community rather than as a solitary effort.

The ability of X. virginica to recognize nestmates allows primaries and secondaries to exclude tertiary bees from their nests.  Tertiary bees are a burden on resources because they do not perform any useful activities, but they benefit from the food and shelter provided by the primary females.

Defense

Territorial behavior in males 
Males will establish territories near an active nest entrance to protect the colony and seek mating opportunities.  For males that are near the nest entrance, their boundaries are usually linear and several meters long.  For males that are farther from the exit, their boundaries are usually in the shape of a square and shorter in length.  Males can stay in one territory for as long as two weeks.  Although they do most of their foraging and resting during the night, they take small breaks throughout the day as well.  After these breaks, they often have to fight off intruders that have taken advantage of their absence.

Flights near the nest are usually uniform and involve much hovering.  Flights protecting a bee's territory can be as short as a few minutes, but may extend beyond an hour.  Males will not react to another bee unless the other is flying at high speed.  When other individuals hover near the nest, it is unlikely that the male will pursue, whereas if another male comes into a territory at a high speed, the territorial male will give chase. When males patrolling the entrance of a nest are confronted with either dead or living Eastern carpenter bees suspended from a thread and dangled within the male's territory, the male does not respond when the bee is suspended and motionless, whether it is living or dead—even though X. virginica are capable of recognizing other individuals of their species.  However, when the suspended bee is released and allowed to fly in the male's territory or is swung through the territory on the thread, the territorial male pursues it.

Parasites 
There is one common species of bombyliid flies known to parasitize the larvae of Xylocopa virginica: Xenox tigrinus.

Marking 
Eastern carpenter bees have mandibular glands that are known to produce a marking chemical in X. hirsutissima that functions as a nest marker or for female attraction.  The glands are present in both males and females, but they produce no marking substance. However, X. virginica does have a Dufour's gland that is used to deposit a scent on a flower immediately following nectar collection.  The scent, composed of hydrocarbons and esters, discourages X. virginica, as well as other bee species, from returning to that same flower.

Stinging 
The male bee is unable to sting because the stinger is simply a modified ovipositor (which males lack by definition), though they will commonly approach human beings and buzz loudly around them or fly close to them. The female, on the other hand, is capable of stinging; while the pain level of these stings is not well-documented, researchers have testified that X. virginica will sting if roughly handled. As the stinger is not barbed, a female can sting multiple times.

Human importance

Agriculture 
X. virginica visits many different kinds of flowers in order to gather pollen and nectar to bring back to the nest for larvae.  Most of the plants they visit are wild grown or grown for decorative value; however, they can be good pollinators of blueberry crops. Their active seasons are quite long, and they forage on a wide variety of plant species.  Also, because the start of their activity season is dependent on temperature, it is easy for greenhouse workers to manipulate the beginning of foraging activity.  However, in comparison to species such as the honey bee, their smaller nest makes them less powerful as pollinators.

Destructive behavior 
Because X. virginica builds its nests in various types of wood, it presents the disadvantage of weakening wood in manmade structures.  They are also able to produce an excrement upon exiting their tunnels that may splash on the sides of buildings and negatively affect the aesthetic appeal of that structure.  However, when weighed against the benefits X. virginica have as pollinators, the costs of its destructive behavior are insignificant.  X. virginica offer benefits in the form of pollination for fruits, vegetables, legumes, and flower crops.  Although the pollination strengths of X. virginica are secondary to that of the bumblebees and honey bees, the contribution is great enough to overlook destructive tendencies.  X. virginica avoid entrances that are stained white, which is a possible solution to keeping them out of unwanted areas.

References

Further reading 
 Mitchell, Theodore B. (1962): Bees of the Eastern United States. Vol. II, The North Carolina Agricultural Experiment Station, Tech. Bul. No.152, pp. 557 (p. 507 ff)
Balduf WV, 1962. Life of the carpenter bee, Xylocopa virginica (Linn.) (Xylocopidae, Hymenoptera). Annals of the Entomological Society of America 55:263-271.
Barrows EM, 1983. Male Territoriality in the Carpenter Bee Xylocopa virginica. Animal Behaviour 31: 806-813.
Barthell JF, Baird TA, 2004. Size variation and Aggression among Male Xylocopa virginica (L.) (Hymenoptera: Apidae) at a Nesting Site in Central Oklahoma. Journal of the Kansas Entomological Society 77:10-20.
Gerling D, Hermann HR, 1976. Biology and Mating Behavior of Xylocopa virginica L. (Hymenoptera, Anthrophoridae). Behavioral Ecology and Sociobiology 3:99-111.
Sabrosky CW, 1962. Mating in Xylocopa virginica. Proceedings of the Entomological Society of America 64:184.
Rau,Phil, 1933. The Jungle Bees and Wasps of Barro Colorado Island: with notes on other insects, Chapter VIII: The Behavior of the Great Carpenter Bee, Xylocopa virginica with notes on the genesis of certain instincts.

External links 

 OSU Agricultural Extension Fact Sheet - HYG-2074-06
 Carpenter Bees - Penn State Entomology Department Fact Sheet

Xylocopinae
Hymenoptera of North America
Insects of Canada
Insects of the United States
Fauna of the Eastern United States
Fauna of the Great Lakes region (North America)
Ecology of the Appalachian Mountains
Insects described in 1771
Taxa named by Carl Linnaeus